Codium silvae is a species of seaweed in the Codiaceae family.

In Western Australia is found along the coast in the Goldfields-Esperance region from two areas; one near Esperance and the other near Eucla.

References

silvae
Plants described in 1984